Discrimination against asexual people, also known as acephobia or aphobia, encompasses a range of negative attitudes, behaviours, and feelings toward asexuality or people who identify as part of the asexual spectrum. Negative feelings or characterisations toward asexuality include dehumanisation, the belief that asexuality is a mental illness, that asexual people cannot feel love, and the refusal to accept asexuality as a genuine sexual orientation. Asexuality is sometimes confused with celibacy, abstinence, antisexualism, or hyposexuality.

There have been efforts to combat anti-asexual discrimination through legislation or education (such as through workshops on asexuality).

Classification 
Behaviours and attitudes that are considered discriminatory include the idea that asexuality is a mental illness, that asexuality is a phase or a choice, the idea that asexual people cannot feel love, and those that make asexual people feel dehumanised. Aspects of discrimination experienced can depend on other parts of one's identity. Despite an increase in media attention over the years, asexuality remains widely poorly-understood; one Sky News survey found that 53 per cent of 1,119 respondents felt confident in defining asexuality, but that 75 per cent of this group did so incorrectly, or defined asexual people as simply lacking a libido.

In 2011, LGBT activist Dan Savage stated that asexuality was a choice, describing it as "choosing not to have sex" and deeming it unworthy of attention. 

A study on 169 asexual people published in April 2016 by Yale University found that many encountered dismissal and scepticism on coming out. There have been efforts to stop the exclusion of asexuals from LGBT pride events.

Asexual people whose asexuality has been accepted only because there is no other explanation for their lack of interest in sexual activity have come to be known as "unassailable asexual[s]". Disbelieving attitudes towards asexuality can leave asexual people afraid to come out.

A 2017 LGBT survey conducted by the Government of the United Kingdom found that two per cent of more than 108,000 respondents identified as asexual. Asexual people had the joint-lowest (alongside pansexual people) average life satisfaction of any sexual orientation amongst cisgender respondents. The results of the survey also showed asexual people to be the least comfortable cisgender LGBT group within the United Kingdom, and 89 per cent of cisgender asexual respondents – the highest percentage of any group surveyed – were reluctant to be open with their identity for fear of negative reactions.

Social discrimination
Asexual people may be socially discriminated against due to beliefs of heterosexuality being the default sexuality, or the belief that asexual people are just gay or lesbian people in denial of their "real" identity. Some asexual people have even been known to experience gay bashing due to their asexuality being misperceived as homosexuality. Asexuality has also been used as a tool in anti-blackness to "de-sexualise" some black people through racist stereotypes, such as in the mammy archetype in the United States.

Two studies found that asexual people are more dehumanised than heterosexuals, homosexuals, and bisexuals, often being compared to animals or robots due to their sexuality.

Having emerged more recently as an identity, asexual people often have less legal protection than gay, lesbian, and bisexual people, although in New York, the Sexual Orientation Non-Discrimination Act categorises asexuals as a protected class. Asexuals have also been known to have been subjected to corrective rape. They may be pressured into engaging in sexual activity, and into going to a doctor to have their asexuality "fixed". A 2015 survey found that 43.5 per cent of the almost 8000 asexual people polled had encountered sexual violence, despite the misconception that asexual people never encounter or are involved in sexual situations and are therefore unable to be sexually assaulted.

Some, such as the sociologist Mark Carrigan, believe that discrimination against asexual people has more to do with marginalisation than the typical hatred associated with other forms of sexuality-based discrimination such as homophobia, and that much discrimination against asexual people results from a lack of understanding and awareness of asexuality.

A study of 248 asexual college students shows that some asexual people do not identify with the LGBT umbrella. There is also controversy over the inclusion of asexuality in the LGBT and queer umbrellas for a variety of reasons, including the belief that asexuals do not experience oppression akin to homophobia and transphobia, and the belief that asexuality is not a sexual orientation. Sherronda J. Brown of Wear Your Voice stated that some people who oppose the inclusion of asexual people in the LGBT community have been known to argue that asexuals are not discriminated against at all, and that asexual people experience straight privilege. Brown criticised this view as erasing the asexual identity on the assumption that asexual people are fraudulent infiltrators of the LGBT community, and because it assumes that everyone is straight unless proven otherwise.

A study of 148 undergraduates at a Canadian university found evidence to suggest that negative attitudes towards asexuals were higher than that of homosexuals and bisexuals. The study also showed that participants were less likely to rent to asexuals than their heterosexual counterparts. However, they were more likely to rent to asexuals than bisexuals. In addition, the study found a positive correlation between right-wing authoritarian identification and negative attitudes towards asexuality.

In another study, 101 participants (none of whom belonged to a sexual minority) were asked to complete an online survey on SurveyMonkey. To rule out unfamiliarity as the cause of negative attitudes, they included questions on sapiosexuals. The study showed that people were less familiar with sapiosexuals. However, attitudes towards asexuals were less positive than that of sapiosexuals which suggests that unfamiliarity may not play a significant role in aphobia.

In March 2018, the Dutch Council of State refused an asylum application by an Algerian national who feared being persecuted due to his asexuality, stating that asexuality does not fall under the LGBT exception to the safe country of origin concept because it is not punishable in Algeria and that asexual people are not discriminated against there. The ruling was overturned by the District Court of The Hague, who said that asexuality does fall under the exception because they considered "social discrimination on the grounds of sexual orientation" to include "deviation from traditional relationships" as well as sexual acts.

In the same year, the UK's LGBT Foundation stated that, because of a lack of awareness and apprehension, asexual communities are frequently overlooked in the LGBT community.

Institutionalised discrimination
A study published by Nova Science Publishers found little evidence of institutional discrimination against asexuals because of their asexuality. The authors of the study theorised that this may be because most sexual orientation-based discrimination is religious in nature, while asexuality may be considered "morally justifiable given that a lack of sexual attraction/desires has been considered a desirable state by many religious institutions for hundreds of years."

In some jurisdictions, marriages can be voided if not legitimised by consummation. This has been viewed as discriminatory to asexuals. Sex education programmes in schools have also been known to discriminate against asexuals.

In early 2015, Russia passed a law banning, amongst others, people with "disorders of sexual preference" from obtaining driving licences. The Association of Russian Lawyers for Human Rights stated that it effectively banned "all transgender people, bigender, asexuals, transvestites, cross-dressers, and people who need sex reassignment" from driving.

Media and services
Some online dating services, including Bumble, and Match.com lack the option for users to identify as asexual, which obstructs their ability to find romantic partners.

Asexuality is sometimes represented in media as undesirable. In 2012, the TV medical drama House was criticised for its portrayal of asexuality within the medical profession and encouraging scepticism on the legitimacy of asexuality. The storyline centred on the assumption that the asexuality of the episode's patients – a married asexual couple – was the result of a medical condition, with one asexual character being described as a "giant pool of algae" and the titular character betting $100 on finding a medical reason behind another's asexuality; the show was criticised by AVEN founder David Jay for its depiction of asexuality as a "problematic and pathological" medical condition. In 2017, the decision to turn the character Jughead in Riverdale (a television programme based on Archie Comics) from asexual to heterosexual was met with disapproval, with one branding it "asexual erasure".

In 2019, the video game Death Stranding was criticised for portraying asexuality as a lifestyle, implying that whom one is attracted to is a choice, mistaking asexuality for not wanting emotional bonds, and insinuating that asexuality is responsible for the decline of the birth rate in its world. When the game released a director's cut version in 2021, the data log describing these views is updated and contains an addenum that notes the log "advances a controversial thesis widely regarded as unsubstantiated and discriminatory". This change was praised by critics for acknowledging the criticism that the game originally had, correcting their mistake, and further expanding on why the original log was problematic.

Anti-discrimination endeavours
In New York, the Sexual Orientation Non-Discrimination Act categorises asexuals as a protected class.

The Asexual Visibility and Education Network (AVEN), an organisation founded in 2001 by David Jay, aims to raise awareness of asexuality, through such means as discussions in schools about asexuality and discouraging discriminatory attitudes towards the sexuality. Asexual Awareness Week is an annual event formed by Sarah Beth Brooks in 2010, also with the aim of raising asexual awareness and dispelling misconceptions. There have been attempts to increase awareness of asexuality in universities. A number of community support groups for asexual people have been formed, such as Asexuals of the Mid-Atlantic, a meetup group for asexual people centred in Washington D.C., whose members founded The Asexual Awareness Project, an asexual advocacy organisation.

In autumn 2014, the book The Invisible Orientation: An Introduction to Asexuality, written by Julie Sondra Decker, was published, with Decker stating that the aim of the book was for it to be used in sex education to increase common knowledge of sexuality.

In 2015, United Kingdom Labour Party parliamentary candidate George Norman called for Parliament to add asexuality to its existing equality legislation, and to recognise that one per cent of the UK's electorate identified as asexual.

In 2016, the Asexual Aromantic Alliance was founded at Iowa State University to encourage co-operation between the asexual and aromantic communities, with the aim of "help[ing to] eliminate acephobia."

References

Asexuality
Discrimination against LGBT people